Natalija Prednik (born February 25, 1973, in Maribor) is a Slovenian sport shooter. She tied for 20th place in the women's 10 metre air rifle event at the 2000 Summer Olympics.

References

1973 births
Living people
ISSF rifle shooters
Slovenian female sport shooters
Olympic shooters of Slovenia
Shooters at the 2000 Summer Olympics